The 2020 FIA R-GT Cup is the sixth edition of the FIA rally cup for GT cars in Group R-GT. The cup is being contested over 2 tarmac rounds from the WRC and one the ERC.

Calendar 
The calendar for the 2020 season features eight tarmac rallies: two rounds from the WRC and one round from the ERC.

Entries

Results

Standings
Points are awarded to the top ten classified finishers.

Source:

FIA R-GT Cup for Drivers

FIA R-GT Cup for Manufacturers

References 

FIA R-GT Cup
R-GT Cup